Piper's Hill Ward is a 2-member ward within Kettering Borough Council which is statistically regarded as a marginal ward between Liberal Democrats and the Conservatives. The ward was last fought at Borough Council level in the 2015 local council elections, in which one seat was won by the Conservatives and one seat was won by Labour.

The current councillors are Cllr. Duncan Bain and Cllr. Anne Lee.

Councillors
Kettering Borough Council Elections 2015
Duncan Bain (Conservative)
Anne Lee (Labour Party (UK))

Kettering Borough Council Elections 2007
Duncan Bain (Conservative)
Philip Hollobone MP (Conservative)

Kettering Borough Council Elections 2003
Ursula Jones (Conservative)
Jamie Richardson (Conservative)

Kettering Borough Council Elections 1999
John Coleman (Liberal Democrat) - served as Mayor from 2000-2001.
Fred Brown (Conservative)

Current Ward Boundaries (2007-)

Kettering Borough Council Elections 2007
At the 2007 elections, Piper's Hill ward was enlarged with part of the former Warkton ward, a Labour-held ward.

Historic Ward Boundaries (1999-2007)

Kettering Borough Council Elections 2003

(Vote count shown is ward average)

Kettering Borough Council Elections 1999

(Vote count shown is ward average)

See also
Kettering
Kettering Borough Council

Electoral wards in Kettering